Anna Strasser (15 April 1921 – 17 May 2010) was a German resistance activist during World War ll who helped forced labor and concentration camp victims until her arrest in 1944. She emerged from her internment in successive concentration camps and prisons, followed by time in a labour camp.

Early life

Early years
Anna Strasser was born in St. Valentin, a small country town a short distance to the south of Linz, Austria. She was the twelfth of her parents' children and had two half-siblings from her father's first marriage.  

Strasser's father, Johann Strasser, worked for an insurance company and died in 1938. After her father died, Strasser's mother assumed her husband's job at the insurance agency while her eldest stepdaughter took charge of the family shop.  At the age of seventeen, Strasser embarked on a twelve-month commercial apprenticeship in Linz in the support office of a medical doctor.

On her eighteenth birthday in 1939, Strasser began working in the bookkeeping department at the warehouse depot of an agricultural co-operative in Mauthausen.

World War ll

Activity 
The agricultural co-operative Strasser worked at was required to provide produce to the Mauthausen-Gusen concentration camp. SS officers reportedly boasted to Strasser about their killings of inmates. Not all the SS members she met were so casual about inmate deaths.  One very young man came into pay the bills who seemed to have been profoundly traumatised by what he had seen. Strasser told the man that he should place himself "on the side of the good ones", and use his position to the benefit of inmates. The two shook hands and the man left; Strasser never saw him again, but often prayed for him.

Every day, as she took her short walk after lunch beside the ramp leading from the railway to the camp, Strasser took to carrying basic supplies with her, such as bread, sugar, biscuits, needles and twine with buttons.  Sometimes she dropped them where inmates might find them, and inmates learned to watch for her lunchbreak walks.  On one occasion she was rewarded with a letter of gratitude that the inmates had managed to send using the postal service. 

Her colleague Franz Winklehner, the store manager, began purchasing maize, turnips, cabbage and potatoes from farmers making deliveries to the depot, exchanging them for fertilizers and settling the balance.  He sometimes threw bread and cigarettes to newly arrived detainees being herded along the ramp from the train, past his office, to the camp.  Winklehner's home was in the same building as the co-operative offices. One evening towards the end of 1940 the Winklehners received a visit at home from two Gestapo men during their evening meal. He was taken to Linz for questioning and then taken to the Dachau concentration camp.  On 26 February 1941 his wife received a letter in which he wrote that he would probably be released in a couple of months in an amnesty to be announced in celebration of Hitler's birthday. However, this did not come to be, as news later came that he had died, allegedly of "circulatory disorders". Strasser was able to accompany his widow to see his body.  During the visit they were able to see the man in his coffin briefly, but the widow was shouted at when she went to touch Winklehner's corpse.

With the pressures of war intensifying, in 1942 Anna Strasser was recruited to work in the vast new Nibelungenwerk (factory) at nearby Herzograd (administratively part of St. Valentin), where Tiger Tanks were being produced by a workforce that would eventually reach approximately 15,000. Strasser worked at the tank plant until her arrest in September 1944. She was assigned, in the first instance, to the accounts department where she found herself with "a jovial boss and lovely colleagues". When she look out of the windows, she could see prisoners from Mauthausen, who had been conscripted as forced labourers to work at the plant, being beaten to death. One day she suffered a nervous and physical collapsed and wept uncontrollably for a sustained period. This led to her being placed on sick leave for many weeks. After being seen by a specialist doctor she was assigned to work half time, working mornings and then returning home while colleagues remained at work through the afternoon. This gave her much more time than hitherto to attend to the needs of government victims. 

One opportunity was provided by the arrival of large numbers of Jewish families from Hungary at the Windberg camp, which was approximately 15 minutes away. Each day these people were driven past the Strasser family's shop to the sports fields behind the house, where they were tasked with building bunkers. They were mostly former office workers, completely unused to the heavy physical work which was now required of them, and they frequently needed help. One of the detainees was a doctor who repeatedly visited the shop and took the opportunity to push notes to Maria Strasser, Anna's sister, begging for certain specified drugs and medications. Strasser began visiting Dr. Kleinsasser, the local railway doctor, who although a party member, was sympathetic to her cause. Strasser told him why she needed the drugs and the doctor wrote out the necessary prescriptions, identifying her as the patient.  She took the prescriptions to one of the various pharmacies in any one of six towns in the area, in order to avoid triggering suspicion. After dark she took the medications to the sports fields and left them in pre-agreed locations. Sometimes she set off the barking of dogs, but she was never caught.

Arrest
During 1943 and most of 1944 Strasser continued to seek out opportunities to help victims of government persecution. During the middle part of 1944, the Strasser sisters received a visit from two gentlemen, allegedly from a Vienna-based resistance group, who asked about the progress of their various projects.  During subsequent interrogation Strasser realised that the two gentlemen were sent by the Gestapo.  She was arrested at the end of the afternoon on 11 September 1944 when she arrived home to find the local policeman waiting for her in an agitated state. She knew him well; he regularly went bowling with her brother-in-law. He told her that a Gestapo man was waiting for her in the house. After she briefly greeted her sister and some customers in the shop, she went through to the living room, where a tall man in civilian dress was waiting for her. He explained politely that he had to arrest her for anti-state activities.  She was taken across the road to the police station, where she was left with the local policeman in a first-floor waiting room, from where she was able to make one or two short telephone calls to friends and relatives.  By the time she was taken out, it was dark. She was escorted onto a bus that was normally used to take people to work at the Nibelungenwerk (tank factory). The bus was full of people, some of whom were strangers but many of whom she knew. Some were tied up, others not.  She sat beside a Polish doctor whom she knew because they both worked at the factory. She gave him the last of the biscuits she had with her along with some cigarettes, earning herself a shouted reprimand from a Gestapo man accompanying them:  "We are not in a coffee house, what are you thinking of!".

The bus reached St. Pölten at around ten o'clock that evening.  The Gestapo office was full so they were taken to the district courthouse, where they were handed over to the policeman in charge. After he had taken their personal details and their belongings, amid a certain amount of mutual apologising, the prisoners were separated and Strasser was taken to a darkened cell with one other roommate, who was taken away the next day. Later that day she was taken to a larger cell in the same court building where she joined four other women in mending laundry under supervision. That evening they were joined by two more women who had been working off-site during the day.  Strasser told the other women that she didn't know why she was there.  The other six women had all been arrested for relatively trivial offences, but nevertheless each had received an eighteen-month sentence.

Gestapo treatment
Some days later she was taken for interrogation, where she asserted that she had done nothing contrary to the interests of the state.  The interrogations became increasingly aggressive and repetitive, and triggered her anger by attacking her religious beliefs.  On 21 September 1944 she was taken from her cell to the police prison, which had by now become a Gestapo centre. Her escort placed her in a cell, chaining both of her hands and one of her ankles to large iron rings fastened securely into the wall. Tired out by standing but prevented by her chains from sitting or lying down, she managed to settle into a squat. She was not given food for four days. On the second day she was unchained by a policeman and escorted to the bathroom; on returning to her cell, she was chained up again, but less tightly than before.  On the third day three Gestapo men came to her cell and threatened her, saying they would cut off her hair and confiscating her hairpins, shoelaces, suspenders and bra. On the fourth day a policeman snuck her a piece of bread. 

While not being interrogated she reflected and prayed. She was forced to listen as one of her interrogators dictated a telegramme to the authorities in St. Valentin mandating the arrest of four of her friends. After about a week her angry interrogators became uncannily smooth and polite. She was brought to an office, where she was told that the authorities were not really interested in the little people such as herself, but in the "big fish" of the resistance movement. She was to be returned to society if she collaborated with her interrogators; otherwise, they told her she should not expect to come out alive. She was returned to her cell, where she was given bread and a large serving of poor-quality meat stew. She was no longer chained in her cell and was permitted to eat normally. The next day her interrogation session comprised a long eerily well-mannered session during which Strasser dictated her life story, which was converted into a detailed 13-page document that included her recollection of her treatment by the Gestapo and concluded with an assurance that if she ever got out she would resume her support for needy people. The contents were largely or wholly already known to her interrogator and she was able to dictate without interruption. 

On 30 September 1944 she was returned to the St. Pölten district courthouse, where she rejoined her co-workers, mending laundry in the "sewing room" cell. She was welcomed back to the courthouse cell block with enthusiasm.  Her hitherto atheist comrade Sophie Krakovski admitted to having prayed for her safe return every day and claimed to have been converted to belief by Strasser's return. Strasser had lost weight and her body was covered with bruises. When asked about her treatment she reassured her friends that she had not been beaten, merely thrown down the stairs. After admitting to her supervisor that she was not a competent seamstress, she was assigned to a wider range of jobs, such as delivering meals, clearing out the cellar, and working in the gardens, where she was able to eat carrots. She was granted a wider range of freedoms than before, such as being permitted to wave to soldiers housed in the barracks across the road from the courthouse building. On some Sundays she was allowed out in order to attend Mass.  She was permitted to receive a visit from her pregnant sister Helli and, under the supervision of a Gestapo man, permitted to eat some of the apples Helli had brought. The relaxed meeting with Helli was cut short by an air-raid warning, whereupon her sister and the Gestapo man ran off to the air-raid shelter, where the Gestapo man attempted to find out more about her "activities" from her sister. Her sister could honestly assert that she knew nothing about any of Anna Strasser's activities that was likely to interest the man. Throughout late 1944, Strasser continued to sometimes be asked by the Gestapo to identify suspected anti-government activists. Sometimes they were people she recognised, but as far as the Gestapo were concerned she never succeeded in recognising any. She never found out whether she was always believed over this.

Post-war 
After the war, with Lower Austria under Soviet occupation, Dr. Kleinsasser was denounced to the Soviet authorities as a Nazi and taken away.  Strasser, by this time at liberty, accompanied the doctor's son (another doctor) to visit the Soviet military commander for the region and told the man about the many prescriptions  Dr. Kleinsasser had written out, despite knowing that they were for Jewish prisoners. The Soviet commander allowed Kleinsasser to go home, and he lived on in St. Valentin for several more years.

Post-war life 
Anna later worked as a sales representative promoting Persil washing powder. For several decades following the war, she kept her Nazi-era activities to herself, but during the 1980s, she began to tell her story of that period. In 1999, the municipal authorities at St. Valentin made her an honorary citizen in recognition of her work.

Notes

References

People from Amstetten District
Austrian resistance members
People condemned by Nazi courts
Ravensbrück concentration camp survivors
1921 births
2010 deaths